Ananda Nagar is a village in the Joypur  CD block in the Jhalda subdivision of the Purulia district in the state of West Bengal, India.

History
Prabhat Ranjan Sarkar (Shrii Shrii Anandamurti), founder of the Ananda Marga, coined the name  Ananda Nagar and set up Ananda Nagar as headquarters of Ananda Marg Gurukul, with the objective of developing a university and a township. Asthi Pahad, a hill south-west of Ananda Nagar, contains ancient fossils. Maharshi Kapila was born at Pat Jhalda, 23 km south-west of Ananda Nagar, 3,500 years ago. Baglata, which now has a post office, means the abode of tigers in creepers and shrubs.

Geography

Location

Ananda Nagar is not identified as a separate inhabited place in the 2011 census.

Area overview
Purulia district forms the lowest step of the Chota Nagpur Plateau. The general scenario is undulating land with scattered hills. Jhalda subdivision, shown in the map alongside, is located in the western part of the district, bordering Jharkhand. The Subarnarekha flows along a short stretch of its western border. It is an overwhelmingly rural subdivision with 91.02% of the population living in the rural areas and 8.98% living in the urban areas. There are 3 census towns in the subdivision. The map alongside shows some of the tourist attractions in the Ajodhya Hills. The area is home to Purulia Chhau dance with spectacular masks made at Charida. The remnants of old temples and deities are found in the subdivision also, as in other parts of the district.

Note: The map alongside presents some of the notable locations in the subdivision. All places marked in the map are linked in the larger full screen map.

Transport
There is a station at Pundag on the NSC Bose Gomoh-Hatia line of the South Eastern Railway.

Education  
Ananda Marga College was established in 1966. Affiliated with the Sidho Kanho Birsha University, it offers honours courses in Bengali, English, history, geography, and general courses in arts and science. It has separate hostel for boys and girls. Over the years the college has provided higher education to students from poor families living in 60 villages around Ananda Nagar.

Ananda Marga Gurukula Teacher's Training College received formal approval in 2014.

Ananda Marga High School is a Bengali-medium boys only institution established in 1964. It has facilities for teaching from class V to class X.

Healthcare
The Ananda Marga mission runs a 36-bed hospital.

References

Villages in Purulia district